The Ambassador of the United Kingdom to Bahrain is the United Kingdom's foremost diplomatic representative in the Kingdom of Bahrain and is head of the UK's diplomatic mission in Manama.  The official title is His Britannic Majesty's Ambassador to the Kingdom of Bahrain.

List of heads of mission

Ambassador to Bahrain

1971–1972: Alexander Stirling
1972–1975: Robert Tesh
1975–1979: Edward Given
1979–1981: Harold Walker
1981: David Crawford
1981–1984: Roger Tomkys
1984–1988: Francis Trew
1988–1992: John Shepherd
1992–1996: Hugh Tunnell
1996–1999: Ian Lewty
1999–2003: Peter Ford
2003–2006: Robin Lamb
2006–2011: Jamie Bowden
2011–2015: Iain Lindsay
2015–2019:Simon Martin
2019–2023: Roderick Drummond
2023-present: Ben Fender

References

External links
UK and Bahrain, gov.uk

Bahrain
 
United Kingdom Ambassadors